Peer Gynt is a 1919 German silent film directed by Victor Barnowsky and Richard Oswald and starring Heinz Salfner, Ilka Grüning and Lina Lossen.
It is based upon the play by Henrik Ibsen.

Cast
 Heinz Salfner as Peer Gynt 
 Ilka Grüning as Aase  
 Lina Lossen as Solveig  
 Hans Sternberg as Jon Gynt  
 Georg John as Prof. Dr. Begriffenfeldt  
 John Gottowt as der Dovre-Alte  
 Irmgard von Hansen as Ingrid  
 Maria Forescu as Die Grüngekleidete  
 Conrad Veidt as Ein fremder Passagier 
 Hanna Lierke as Anitra  
 Richard Senius 
 Gertrud von Hoschek 
 Anita Berber

References

Bibliography
 John T. Soister. Conrad Veidt on Screen: A Comprehensive Illustrated Filmography. McFarland, 2002.

External links

1919 films
Films of the Weimar Republic
Films directed by Richard Oswald
German silent feature films
Films based on works by Henrik Ibsen
Works based on Peer Gynt
German black-and-white films
1910s German films